Charles Frederick Hughes (14 October 1866 – 28 May 1934) was an admiral in the United States Navy who served as Chief of Naval Operations from 1927 to 1930.

Early life
Born in Bath, Maine, Hughes was appointed to the United States Naval Academy in 1884. Upon graduation on 8 June 1888, he went to the Fleet for the customary two years at sea preceding a commission as an ensign. He received that commission on 1 July 1890, and was promoted to lieutenant (junior grade) on 27 April 1898.

Naval career

During the Spanish–American War, Hughes fought in Commodore George Dewey's Asiatic Squadron. He was promoted to lieutenant on 3 March 1899. While serving ashore at the Bureau of Equipment from 1904 to 1906, he was promoted to lieutenant commander on 1 July 1905. During a tour of duty as recorder for the Board of Inspection and Survey between 1909 and 1911, he was promoted to commander.

In 1913, Hughes became chief of staff to the Commander, Atlantic Fleet, and served in that capacity during the occupation of Veracruz, Veracruz, Mexico, in the spring of 1914. Promoted to captain on 10 July 1914, he returned to shore duty later that year to serve with the General Board. His ship served in the American battleship squadron that operated with the Royal Navy's Grand Fleet at Scapa Flow in the Orkney Islands through World War I.

Hughes left New York just before the Armistice. On 10 October 1918, he was promoted to rear admiral. His first assignment as a flag officer was as commandant at the Philadelphia Navy Yard from late 1918 to 1920. Between 1920 and 1921, Hughes was Commander, 2d Battleship Squadron, Atlantic Fleet. From the latter part of 1921 to 25 June 1923 he commanded Divisions 7 and 4 of the Battle Fleet. Coming ashore again in 1923, he became President of the Naval War College at Newport, Rhode Island, on 1 July. A year later, Hughes moved to the job of Director of Fleet Training.

That assignment lasted until 10 October 1925. Soon thereafter, Hughes was appointed Commander in Chief, Battle Fleet. On 14 November 1927 Admiral Hughes became the fourth person to occupy the office of Chief of Naval Operations. He completed his tour of duty in that post on 11 September 1930 and, on 14 October 1930, retired to his home in Chevy Chase, Maryland. He died in 1934 and was buried in Arlington National Cemetery.

References

External links

 Charles Frederick Hughes Papers, 1884–1888 MS 279 held by Special Collections & Archives, Nimitz Library at the United States Naval Academy

1866 births
1934 deaths
American military personnel of the Spanish–American War
People from Bath, Maine
Chiefs of Naval Operations
Burials at Arlington National Cemetery